The Khan Khwar Hydropower Plant is a run-of-the-river project located near the town of Besham in Shangla District on the Khan Khwar River, a right bank tributary of the Indus River in Khyber Pakhtunkhwa province, Pakistan. It is approximately 265 km from the federal capital of Islamabad and 350 km from provincial capital of Peshawar.

There are two vertical Francis turbine units of 34 MW and one unit of 4 MW installed at the Khan Khwar Hydroelectric Station, with an average annual generation capacity of 595 million units (GWh) of cheap electricity. These turbines are manufactured by Dongfang Electric Machinery Co. Ltd. The project was completed by the technical assistance of Chinese corporations (Sinohydro Corporation via a consortium with China Water Resources Beifang Investigation, Design and Research Co. Ltd).

Construction of the Khan Khwar Hydropower Plant commenced in April 2003, and the project was completed in April 2012. The power house commenced commercial operations in November 2010. The project was officially inaugurated on 14 July 2012 by Prime Minister of Pakistan Raja Pervez Ashraf. The total cost of the project was about PKR 10.73 billion, out of which PKR 5.049 billion accounted for the foreign exchange component.

Dam:Type: RCCLength: 112 m.Height: 46 m.Design discharge: 29 cusecsDesign head: 244 m.

See also 

 List of dams and reservoirs in Pakistan
 List of power stations in Pakistan
 Satpara Dam
 Allai Khwar Hydropower Project
 Gomal Zam Dam

References 

Dams completed in 2012
Energy infrastructure completed in 2012
Dams in Pakistan
Hydroelectric power stations in Pakistan
Run-of-the-river power stations
Dams in the Indus River basin
China–Pakistan relations
Dams in Khyber Pakhtunkhwa